Kaddam or Kadam may refer to:

Kaddam, Adilabad district, Telangana, India
Kaddam Project, a reservoir on the Kadem River, Nirmal District
Kadam river, a river Adilabad district